Beybostan is a village in the Gerger District, Adıyaman Province, Turkey. The village is populated by Turks and had a population of 171 in 2021.

References

Villages in Gerger District